Pullen Island may refer to:

 Pullen Island (Antarctica)
 Pullen Island (Canada), named by William Pullen
 Pullen Island (South Australia), also named by William Pullen